GR 10 is a French GR footpath, or hiking trail, that runs the length of the Pyrenees Mountains. It roughly parallels the French–Spanish border on the French side. Those attempting the entire trail often choose to walk it from west to east, from Hendaye on the Bay of Biscay to Banyuls-sur-Mer on the Mediterranean Sea, but it can also be traversed east to west.

Description
Hiking the entire route is estimated to take around 52 days for hikers who are physically fit and used to mountain hiking. Some stretches involve a lot of ascending and descending, including a few one-day sections that can climb and then descend , but the GR 10 is a hiking trail, and there is no actual mountain climbing involved.

Lodging along the route that cater to walkers include hotels, gîtes d'étape, and very basic mountain refuges. Camping is only necessary for two or three nights in the Ariège section. Some walkers walk one section of the trail at a time, completing the route over several visits.

The trail is well marked with red and white painted blazes. It appears on all regional maps, including on Michelin roadmaps. The route is within the area shown by the Editions Sud-Ouest Rando éditions range of maps (numbers 1–11), which are based on French Institut Géographique National 1:50,000 scale maps.  Parts of the route, especially around towns and villages, change from year to year, so walkers should carry the most recent editions of the maps and guides.

A number of sections include alternative routes of a less demanding nature. Some alternatives offer more scenic choices, for example the alternative route from Cauterets to Luz-Saint-Sauveur takes in Pont d'Espagne, the Refuge Oulettes de Gaube, the Refuge Baysellance, Gavarnie, Gedre and Pragneres, and offers more spectacular mountain scenery.

Another notable section is near the village of Etsaut, where the route follows the Chemin de la Mâture, a track carved into a sheer cliff face. This path was created in the 18th century to facilitate the transport of tree trunks destined to be made into masts for French warships.

There are four very detailed guide books (in French) describing the GR 10. These are published by the Fédération Française de la Randonnée Pédestre (French Hiking Federation). These guide books can be purchased at most large sports stores in the region, and in a few of the largest sports stores in the major cities in France.  English guides are also available.

The Spanish GR 11 is a similar route on the Spanish side of the border, while the only-occasionally-marked Haute Randonnée Pyrénéenne (HRP) follows a generally higher route through the Pyrenees, from mountaintop to mountaintop, frequently crossing from one side of the border to the other.

Weather 
The best time for hiking on the GR 10 is late spring/early summer and late summer/early fall. In the middle of the summer the heat can become a problem, though some of the ski stations on the route open their lifts for summer walkers, providing opportunities for hikers to avoid some ascents and descents. In the fall mountain storms become more frequent, making conditions dangerous. In winter most of the GR 10 is impassable due to snow.

The first high pass walking from the Atlantic Ocean is the Hourquette d'Arre (2465m). Walking from the Mediterranean Sea, the equivalent high pass is the Coma d'Anyell (2450m). Both are normally snowed up until about 14 June (in 2013 two weeks later). These are about 14 and 9 days in from the respective starting points.

Departments crossed 
The GR 10 passes through the French departments of:
Pyrénées-Atlantiques
Hautes-Pyrénées
Haute-Garonne
Ariège
Pyrénées-Orientales

Towns, villages and other stopping places 

Some commonly used overnight stops with camping or gîte facilities include:
Hendaye
Olhette
Ainhoa
Bidarray
Saint-Étienne-de-Baïgorry
Saint-Jean-Pied-de-Port
Esterencuby
Col Bagargiak
Logibar (Larrau)
Saint-Engrace
Arette-la-Pierre-Saint-Martin
Lescun
Etsaut
Gabas
Gourette
Arrens-Marsous
Cauterets (and Gavarnie and Gedre via alternative route)
Luz-Saint-Sauveur
Barèges
Chalet Hotel Lac de L'Oule
Vielle Aure
Germ
Lac d'Oo
Bagnères-de-Luchon
Fos
Refuge de l'Etang d'Araing
Eylie d'en haut
Cabane de Besset
Etang d'Ayes
Aunac
Rouze
St Lizier d'Ustou
Aulus-les-Bains
Mounicou
Goulier
Siguer
Refuge de Clarans
Refuge de Rulhe
Mérens-les-Vals
Refuge des Besines
Refuge des Bouilloises
Planes
Refuge du Ras de la Caranca
Mantet
Refuge de Mariailles
Chalet Hotel des Cortalets
Mines de Batere
Moulin de la Palette
Las Illas
Chalet de l'Albere
Banyuls-sur-Mer

References

External links

 GR10 – La Grande Traversée — complete trail topography (in French)
 The Pyrenean Way — A site dedicated to the GR10, here called the "Pyrenean Way"
 GR10 From Hendaye to Estérençuby (Pyrenées-Atlantiques)
 GR10 From Estérençuby to Borce (Pyrenées-Atlantiques)
 GR10 From Borce (Pyrenées-Atlantiques) to Oule Lake (Hautes-Pyrenées)
 GR10 From Oule Lake (Hautes-Pyrenées) to Bethmale Lake (Ariège)
 GR10 From Bethmale Lake to Merens-les-Vals (Ariège)
 GR10 From Merens-les-Vals (Ariège) to Ras-dels-Cortalets (Pyrenées-Orientales)
 GR10 From Ras-dels-Cortalets to Banyuls-sur-Mer (Pyrenées-Orientales)
 GR10 Across the Pyrenees from the Atlantic to the Mediterranean (full itinerary)

Geography of Ariège (department)
Geography of Haute-Garonne
Geography of Hautes-Pyrénées
Geography of Pyrénées-Atlantiques
Geography of Pyrénées-Orientales
Pyrenees
Hiking trails in France
Tourist attractions in Nouvelle-Aquitaine
Tourist attractions in Ariège (department)
Tourist attractions in Haute-Garonne
Tourist attractions in Hautes-Pyrénées
Tourist attractions in Occitania (administrative region)
Tourist attractions in Pyrénées-Atlantiques
Tourist attractions in Pyrénées-Orientales